Bhavani Junction is a 1985 Indian Bollywood crime drama film directed by H. Dinesh and produced by Deepak Shivdasani. It stars Shashi Kapoor, Shatrughan Sinha, Zeenat Aman, Rati Agnihotri in pivotal roles. The film was released on 22 November 1985.

Plot 
Police officer Ram is searching for the criminal who rapes and kills his wife. Ram's friend, Bhavani helps him to find out the culprits. Things turn worse when Ram realises that the offender is none other than Rakesh, Bhavani's son.

Cast
 Shashi Kapoor as Raja Bhavani Pratap
 Shatrughan Sinha as SP Ram
 Zeenat Aman as Reshma
 Rati Agnihotri as Shakuntala
 Prem Chopra as Diwanchand
 Deven Verma as Joseph
 Sharat Saxena as Police Chief
 Mazhar Khan as Rakesh "Ricky"
 Mahesh Anand as Kundan

Songs

References

External links

1980s Hindi-language films
1985 crime drama films
1985 films
Films scored by Bappi Lahiri
Indian crime drama films